An albarello (plural: albarelli) is a type of maiolica earthenware jar, originally a medicinal jar designed to hold apothecaries' ointments and dry drugs. The development of this type of pharmacy jar had its roots in the Middle East during the time of the Islamic conquests.

History
The etymology of the word is not clear. Some scholars argue that it derives from the Latin word "albaris" with the meaning of "whitish" while others criticize this interpretation because these jars were originally manufactured in wood. A piece of parchment would overlap the upper half of the jar in order to be affixed with a cord and properly seal the contents. The parchment was white, or bleached white, so that the contents of the jar could be written upon it.

Albarelli were brought to Italy by Hispano-Moresque traders, and the earliest Italian examples were produced in Florence in the 15th century. Albarelli were made in Italy from the first half of the 15th century through to the late 18th century and beyond. Based on Persian designs said to emulate bamboo (the traditional manufacturing material), the jars are usually cylindrical with a slightly concave waist. Variations in size and style can be seen from region to region, ranging from 10 cm to 40 cm in height. Such jars served both functional and decorative purposes in traditional apothecaries and pharmacies, and represented status and wealth. The jars were generally sealed with a piece of parchment or leather tied with a piece of cord.

The maiolica potters' preoccupation with ornamentation and design is nowhere more in evidence than on albarelli during the Renaissance. Common design themes include floral motifs against a white background, to more elaborate designs such as portraits of a cherub or priest, and can include a label describing the contents of the jar. Specific styles of decoration are now associated with various Italian locations, including Florence, Venice, Gerace and Palermo in Sicily.

Literature
 Henry Wallis: The Albarello, London 1904

See also 
 Blue albarellos of the Esteve Pharmacy
 Islamic world contributions to Medieval Europe

References

History of ceramics
Italian pottery
Ceramic art
Pharmacy
Ceramics of medieval Europe
Pottery shapes